Surf Life Saving Australia (SLSA) is an Australian not-for-profit community organisation that promotes water safety and provides surf rescue services.

SLSA strives to create a safe environment on Australia's beaches and coastline through patrols, education and training, public safety campaigns and the promotion of health and fitness.  the organisation had 181,603 members with 314 affiliated surf life saving clubs. The majority of its services are provided by volunteer surf lifesavers, that provided 1.26 million hours of service, rescued 7,731 people, performed 1,609,184 preventative actions and provided 68,766 first aid treatments during 2019/20.  In 1973, the organisation established the Westpac Life Saver Rescue Helicopter Service that, during 2016/17, delivered 850 rescue missions via helicopter.

Surf Life Saving Australia also operates Australia's largest lifeguard service, contracting to local government and other coastal land managers. Additional income is sourced through community donations, fundraising and corporate sponsorship. SLSA is a foundation member of the International Life Saving Federation (ILS).

History 
In 1902 it was against the law to enter the ocean during daylight hours in Australia . A Sydney newspaper editor William Gocher announced his challenge of this law at Manly Beach however it is unclear this act changed the rules.  What did occur is that 10 days after an incident at Bondi on 13 November 1902, Randwick Council became the first to allow daylight bathing. Eventually as more people began to challenge the law it was reversed but inexperienced swimmers were having problems with unusual surf conditions such as rip currents and the number of drownings increased. Groups of volunteers began to patrol the beach to assist and on 21 February 1907 the Bondi Surf Bathers' Life Saving Club was formed. The Surf Bathing Association of New South Wales was formed on 18 October 1907 when nine voluntary surf life saving clubs and representatives of the Royal Life Saving Society (RLSS) met and affiliated to represent the interests of surf lifesavers. In attendance were the Royal Life Saving Society, Manly Surf Club (this a different organisation to the Manly Life Saving Club which was formed in 1911), Bondi Surf Bathers' Life Saving Club, Coogee Surf Life Brigade, Bronte Surf Brigade, Bondi Surf and Social Club (North Bondi SLSC), Tamarama Surf Club (only lasted a few weeks/months and then collapsed), Maroubra Surf Club, United Wanderers Surf Club and Woollahra Surf Club. The meeting resolved: "That it is desirable to form an association of surf clubs, to secure improved facilities for surf bathing, and otherwise promote and regulate the sport..." and "That the association be called 'The Surf Bathing Association of N.S.W."

The name was changed to Surf Life Saving Association of Australia (SLSAA) in 1922; and changed again in 1991 to the current Surf Life Saving Australia.

Women were actively involved in surf-lifesaving for many years, and in 1980 the association rules were changed so that they could become active patrolling members of the SLSA.

Surf Life Saving 
SLSA's vision is zero preventable drowning deaths in Australian waters, and is worked towards through patrolling beaches, coastal risk assessments, education, and training. Since 1907, surf lifesavers have rescued over 650,000 beachgoers. In 2017-18, surf lifesavers and Australian Lifeguard Service (ALS) Lifeguards performed 10,249 rescues, 65,296 first aid treatments, and over 1.5 million preventative actions on Australia's beaches.

States and branches: Geographical areas and divisions
 Life Saving Victoria
 Gippsland, largely within the Shire of East Gippsland
 Bass area
 Geelong area, including the Bellarine Peninsula:
 Bancoora Surf Life Saving Club (SLSC)
 Barwon Heads / Thirteenth Beach SLSC
 Ocean Grove SLSC
 Point Lonsdale SLSC
 Port Phillip area, incorporating parts of the City of Port Phillip and the Cities of Melbourne and Hobsons Bay:
 Altona Lifesaving Club (LSC)
 Elwood LSC
 Port Melbourne LSC
 Sandridge LSC
 South Melbourne LSC
 St Kilda LSC
 Williamstown Swimming and Life Saving Club 
 Kingston area
 Bayside area 
 Peninsula area (Mornington Peninsula)
 Surf Coast area
 Otway area (Otway Coast and Colac Otway Shire):
 Apollo Bay SLSC
 Kennett River SLSC
 Wye River SLSC
 Western area: 
 Mildura LSC
 Port Campbell SLSC
 Port Fairy SLSC
 Portland SLSC
 Warrnambool SLSC
 Surf Lifesaving NSW
 Far North Coast
 North Coast
 Mid North Coast
 Lower North Coast (the most-southerly areas of the Mid North Coast)
 Hunter
 Central Coast
 Sydney Northern Beaches
 Sydney
 Illawarra
 South Coast
 Far South Coast (the most-southerly areas of the South Coast)
 Surf Lifesaving WA
 Surf Lifesaving SA
 Surf Lifesaving Queensland
North Queensland
North Barrier
Wide Bay - Capricorn Coast
Sunshine Coast
Brisbane
South Coast
Point Danger
 Surf Lifesaving TAS
 Surf Lifesaving NT

Membership 
As of 30 June 2020, Surf Life Saving has a membership base of 181,603. Nationally there are 72,689 junior members, or Nippers as they are more commonly known. Nippers are aged between 5–13 years and learn beach safety and awareness skills, in a fun and healthy environment.

Training
Surf lifesavers must be competent swimmers and skilled in rescue techniques, resuscitation and first aid. The entry level qualification to be a surf lifesaver is the Surf Rescue Certificate (SRC). Volunteers must be at least 13 years old to undertake this qualification, which involves theory and practical training, and an assessment of patrolling and lifesaving skills.

Upon completion of the Surf Rescue Certificate, surf lifesavers are encouraged  to undertake the Bronze Medallion and then additional training in the areas of Emergency Care, Powercraft, Beach Management, Aquatic Rescue and Training and Assessment. Lifesavers must also participate in an annual skills maintenance session to ensure that they maintain and update their skills.

International Development
Most of Surf Life Saving’s international work is undertaken in the Asia-Pacific region, not only due to geographical location, but also because of the aquatic environments within the region. Also, as the largest developed country within the Asia Pacific region, a great deal of responsibility to support developing countries lies with Australia.

Research 
Surf Life Saving Australia is focused on exploring statistical and analytical data to support development of education, technology, communications and operations to reduce coastal drowning deaths in Australia. Although SLSA has been conducting research for many years, 2010 was the birth of a dedicated and thorough research program. The SLSA Research Scheme was introduced to adopt rigour into research project design and provide funding for targeted and priority research projects.

See also
Royal Life Saving Society Australia
1907 Sydney bathing costume protests
Australian Water Safety Council
List of Australian surf lifesaving clubs
Surf Life Saving New Zealand

References

External links
Surf Life Saving Australia

Sports governing bodies in Australia
Surf lifesaving
Swimming in Australia
Australian Water Safety Council members
 
Queensland Greats
1907 establishments in Australia
Water sports in Australia